The  was held on 30 December 2020.

Due to the COVID-19 pandemic, the Best Album Award, Songwriting Award, Composition Award, Merit Award, and Planning Award were not presented.

Presenters 
 Riho Yoshioka
 Shinichiro Azumi (TBS Announcer)

Winners

Grand Prix
 LiSA – 
 Artist: LiSA
 Lyrics: LiSA, Yuki Kajiura
 Composition & arranger: Yuki Kajiura
 Producer: Yuki Kajiura

Excellent Work Awards
 Daichi Miura – "I'm Here"
 Junretsu – "Ai wo Kudasai ~Don’t you cry~"
 Little Glee Monster - "Ashiato"
 Nogizaka46 – "Sekaijū no Rinjin yo"
 DISH// - "Neko ~The First Take Ver.~"
 AKB48 - "Hanarete Ite mo"
 Kiyoshi Hikawa – "Haha"
 Da Pump - "Fantasista"
 LiSA - "Homura"

Best New Artist
 Naoki Sanada

New Artist Awards
 Naoki Sanada
 Novelbright
 Mameshiba no Taigun
 Rin-ne

Best Vocal Performance
 Kōhei Fukuda

Special Achievement Award
 Uru
 Demon Slayer: Kimetsu no Yaiba
 NiziU
 Seiko Matsuda
 Kenshi Yonezu

Special Lifetime Achievement Award
 Michiyo Azusa
 Shingo Kobayashi
 Jackey Yoshikawa
 Kyōhei Tsutsumi
 Katsuhisa Hattori
 Mieko Hirota
 Toshiaki Maeda
 Masahito Maruyama

Special International Music Award
 BTS

Special Honor Award
 Arashi

References 

2020
2020 music awards
2020 in Japanese music
Impact of the COVID-19 pandemic on the music industry